Aşağıazaplı is a village in the Gölbaşı District, Adıyaman Province, Turkey. Its population is 383 (2021).

The hamlet of Örencik is attached to the village.

References

Villages in Gölbaşı District, Adıyaman Province